The National Gallery of Ireland houses the national collection of Irish and European art. It is located in the centre of Dublin with one entrance on Merrion Square, beside Leinster House, and another on Clare Street. It was founded in 1854 and opened its doors ten years later. The gallery has an extensive, representative collection of Irish paintings and is also notable for its Italian Baroque and Dutch masters painting. The current director is Caroline Campbell.

History 
In 1853 an exhibition, the Great Industrial Exhibition, was held on the lawns of Leinster House in Dublin. Among the most popular exhibits was a substantial display of works of art organised and underwritten by the railway magnate William Dargan. The enthusiasm of the visiting crowds demonstrated a public for art, and it was decided to establish a permanent public art collection as a lasting monument of gratitude to Dargan. The moving spirit behind the proposal was the barrister John Edward Pigot (1822–1871), son of David Richard Pigot, Chief Baron of the Irish Exchequer, and he became one of the first governors of the gallery.  The façade of the National Gallery copies the Natural History building of the National Museum of Ireland which was already planned for the facing flank of Leinster House. The building itself was designed by Francis Fowke, based on early plans by Charles Lanyon, and was completed and opened in 1864.

The gallery was not founded around an existing collection, and when the gallery opened it had just 112 paintings. In 1866 an annual purchase grant was established and by 1891 space was already limited. In 1897, the Dowager Countess of Milltown indicated her intention of donating the contents of Russborough House to the gallery. This gift included about 223 paintings, 48 pieces of sculpture, 33 engravings, much silver, furniture and a library, and prompted construction from 1899 to 1903 of what is now called the Milltown Wing, designed by Thomas Newenham Deane.

At around this time Henry Vaughan left 31 watercolours by J.M.W. Turner with the requirement that they could only be exhibited in January, this to protect them from the ill-effects of sunlight. Though modern lighting technology has made this stipulation unnecessary, the gallery continues to restrict viewing of the Vaughan bequest to January and the exhibition is treated as something of an occasion.

In addition to his involvement in the gallery, Hugh Lane had also hoped to found a gallery of modern art, something only realised after his death in the Hugh Lane Gallery. George Bernard Shaw also made a substantial bequest, leaving the gallery a third of royalties of his estate in gratitude for the time he spent there as a youth.

The gallery was again extended in 1962 with a new wing designed by Frank DuBerry of the Office of Public Works. This opened in 1968 and is now named the Beit Wing. In 1978 the gallery received from the government the paintings given to the nation by Chester Beatty and in 1987 the Sweeney bequest brought fourteen works of art including paintings by Picasso and Jack B. Yeats. The same year the gallery was once again given some of the contents of Russborough House when Alfred Beit donated 17 masterpieces, including paintings by Velázquez, Murillo, Steen, Vermeer and Raeburn.

In the 1990s a lost Caravaggio, The Taking of Christ, known through replicas, was discovered hanging in a Jesuit house of studies in Leeson Street in Dublin by Sergio Benedetti, senior conservator of the gallery.  The Jesuits have allowed this painting to be exhibited in the gallery and the discovery was the cause of national excitement. The painting was on loan to an Italian gallery from February until July 2010 as part of Caravaggio's 400th anniversary. In 1997 Anne Yeats donated sketchbooks by her uncle Jack Yeats and the gallery now includes a Yeats Museum. Denis Mahon, a well-known art critic, promised the gallery part of his rich collection and eight painting from his promised bequest are on permanent display, including Jacob Blessing the Sons of Joseph by Guercino.

List of directors 

 George Mulvany, 1861–69
 Henry Doyle, 1869–92
 Walter Armstrong, 1892–1914
 Hugh Lane, 1914–15
Walter G. Strickland, 1915–16
 Robert Langton Douglas, 1916–23
 Lucius O'Callaghan, 1923–27
 Thomas Bodkin, 1927–35
 George Furlong, 1935–50
 Thomas McGreevy, 1950–63
 James White, 1964–80
 Homan Potterton, 1980–88
 Raymond Keaveney, 1988–2012
 Sean Rainbird, 2013–2022
 Caroline Campbell 2022–to present

Millennium Wing 

A new wing, called the Millennium Wing, was opened in 2002. Unlike the previous two extensions, this new wing has street frontage and the English architects Benson & Forsyth gave it an imposing Bowers Whitbed, Portland Stone façade and grand atrium. The design originally involved demolishing an adjoining Georgian terrace house and its ballroom mews; however, the Irish planning appeals authority, An Bord Pleanála, required that they be retained.

Master development plan 

In March 2011, the Office of Public Works (OPW), in association with the gallery, commenced work on the historic complex at Merrion Square to address a critical need for the repair and renovation of the fabric of the Dargan (1864) and Milltown (1903) wings, together with the provision of much needed additional accommodation. The first phase of the works programme involved the removal and replacement of the Dargan Wing roof. The next two phases of the project involved the replacement of the Milltown Wing roof, followed by an extensive upgrade of the fabric and services of the two buildings whilst reclaiming their original period elegance. Refurbishment of the two wings was completed in June 2017.

Location, access and facilities 
The National Gallery of Ireland is located in the heart of Georgian Dublin. There are two entrances, one at Merrion Square and the other at Clare Street. Admission to the gallery is free and many talks, tours and events, as well as the audioguide, are also free of charge. The gallery launched a free smartphone app in 2013.

Dublin Bus routes 4, 7 and 7a all pass by the gallery. The Pearse Street DART station is 5 minutes on foot as is the Dawson stop on the green line of the Luas. The Abbey Street stop of the red line of the Luas is a 20-minute walk away. There are two dublinbikes stations just outside the gallery, one at Clare Street and the other at Merrion Square West.

All galleries and entrances are wheelchair and buggy accessible and there are disabled parking spaces outside the Merrion Square entrance. Tours for the visually and hearing impaired are regularly organised. Visitors with guide dogs are welcome in the gallery. The lecture theatre, AV room and gallery shop are all fitted with a loop system for the hearing impaired.

Highlights 
The collection has about 14,000 artworks, including about 2,500 oil paintings, 5,000 drawings, 5,000 prints, and some sculpture, furniture and other works of art.

Spanish 
 Luis de Morales (c.1592–86) St Jerome in the Wilderness 1570s
 Jusepe de Ribera (1591?–1652) St Onuphrius late 1620s
 Diego Velázquez (1599–1660) Kitchen Maid with the Supper of Emmaus, c.1617–18
 Francisco de Zurbarán (1598–1664) The Immaculate Conception early 1660s
 Bartolomé Esteban Murillo (1617–82) The Return of the Prodigal Son c.1660
 Francisco José de Goya y Lucientes (1746–1828) Dona Antonia Zarate c.1805–06
 Pablo Ruiz Picasso (1881–1973) Still-Life with Mandolin 1924
 Juan Gris (1887–1927) Pierrot 1921

French 
 Jacques Yverni (flourished 1410–38) The Annunciation c.1435
 Nicolas Poussin (1594–1665)
 Acis and Galatea 1627–28
 The Lamentation over the Dead Christ 1657–60
 Jean Lemaire (1598–1659) Architecture Landscape with Classical Figures 1627–30
 Jean-Baptiste-Siméon Chardin (1699–1779) Still Life: Two Rabbits, a Grey Partridge, Game Bag and Powder Flask 1731
 Jean-Honoré Fragonard (1732–1806) Venus and Cupid (Day) c.1755
 Eugène Delacroix (1798–1863) Demosthenes on the Seashore 1859
 Gustave Courbet (1819–77) Portrait of Adolphe Marlet 1851
 Alfred Sisley (1819–99) The Banks of the Canal du Loing at Saint-Mammes 1888
 Claude Monet (1840–1926) Argenteuil Basin with a Single Sailboat 1874
 Paul Signac (1863–1935) Lady on the Terrace 1898
 Kees van Dongen (1877–1968) Stella in a Flowered Hat c.1907
 Chaïm Soutine (1893–1943) Landscape with the Flight of Stairs c.1922

Italian 

 Master of Verucchio (14th century) The Crucifixion, Noli me tangere c.1330–40
 Fra Angelico (1417–55) Sts Cosmas and Damian and their Brothers surviving the Stake c.1440–42
 Zanobi Strozzi (attribute to) (1412–68) Assumption of the Virgin with Sts Jerome and Francis 1460s
 Filippino Lippi (1457–1504) Portrait of a Musician late 1480s
 Titian (c.1485/90–1576) Ecce Homo c.1558/60
 Giovan Battista Moroni (before 1524–1578) Portrait of a Gentleman and his two Children c.1570
 Caravaggio (1571–1610) The Taking of Christ 1602
 Guido Reni (1575–1624) The Suicide of Cleopatra c.1639–40
 Domenichino (1581–1641) Saint Mary Magdalene c.1625
 Guercino (1591–1666) Jacob blessing the Sons of Jacob c.1620
 Sassoferrato (1609–85) Virgin and Child 1630s
 Luca Giordano (1634–1705) Venus, Mars and the Forge of Vulcan 1660s
 Carlo Maratta (1625–1713) The Rape of Europa c. 1680–1685
 Francesco Solimena (1657–1747) Allegory of Winter c.1690
 Canaletto (1697–1768) St. Mark's Square c.1756
 Ugolino di Nerio (early 14th Century) Prophet Isaiah
 Paolo Uccello (1397–1475) Virgin and Child

German and Swiss 
 Salzburg School Christ on the Cross with the Virgin Mary and John c.1430
 Master of the Youth of St Romold (active c.1490) St Romold taking leave of his Parents c.1490
 Georg Pencz (active 1500–50) Portrait of a Gentleman 1549
 Angelica Kauffman (1741–1807) The Ely Family 1771
 Emil Nolde (1867–1956) Two Women in a Garden 1915

Flemish 
 Pieter Brueghel the Younger (1564–c.1637) Peasant Wedding 1620
 Peter Paul Rubens (1577–1640) St Peter finding the Tribute Money 1617–18
 Jacob Jordaens (1593–1678)
 The Veneration of the Eucharist c.1630
 The Supper at Emmaus c.1645–65
 Anthony van Dyck (1599–1641) A Boy standing on a Terrace c.1623–24

Dutch 

 Marinus van Reymerswaele (attributed) (c.1490/95–c.1567) The Calling of Matthew c.1530–40
 Gerrit van Honthorst (1590–1656) A Musical Party c.1616–18
 Rembrandt (and studio) (1606–69) La Main Chaude c.1628
 Willem Cornelisz Duyster (1599–1635) Interior with Soldiers 1632
 Aelbert Cuyp (1620–91) Milking Cows 1640s?
 Matthias Stomer (1600–after 1650) The Arrest of Christ c.1641
 Rembrandt (1606–69) Landscape with the Rest on the Flight into Egypt 1647
 Willem Drost (1652–80) Bust of a Man Wearing a Large-brimmed Hat c.1654
 Anthonie de Lorme (1610–73) Interior of St Laurenskerk, Rotterdam c.1660–65
 Gabriel Metsu (1629–67)
 Man Writing a Letter c.1663
 Woman Reading a Letter c.1663
 Jan Steen (1625/26–79)
 The Village School c.1665
 The Marriage Feast at Cana 1665–70
 Johannes Vermeer (1632–75) Lady Writing a Letter with her Maid c.1670
 Cornelis Troost (1696–1750) Jeronimus Tonneman and his son Jeronimus 1736
 Nicolaes de Giselaer Interior with Figures
 Emanuel de Witte Church Interior
 Frans Hals Fisher boy with basket

British and American 
 William Hogarth (1697–1764)
 The Western Family c.1738
 The Mackinen Children c.1747
 Thomas Gainsborough 1727–88
 A view in Suffolk c.1746
 Mrs Christopher Horton (1743–1808) later Duchess of Cumberland 1766
 The Cottage Girl 1785
 Joshua Reynolds (1723–92)
 Parody of Raphael's 'School of Athens'  1751
 The Temple Family 1780–82
 Omai 1776 (On loan from a private collection)
 Charles Coote, The First Earl of Bellamont 1776
 Henry Raeburn (1756–1823) Sir John and Lady Clerk of Penicuik 1791
 George Romney (1734–1802) Titania, Puck and the Changeling, from Shakespeare's 'A Midsummer Night's Dream'  1793
 John Singer Sargent (1856–1925) The Bead Stringers of Venice 1880–82
 Stanley Royle (1888–1961) The Goose Girl c.1921
 Francis Wheatley (1747–1801) The Dublin Volunteers on College Green, 4 November 1779 1779–80
 Andrew Festing (1941–present)

Irish 

Kevin Abosch (photographer) (1969) "Portrait of Brian O'Driscoll" 2011
 James Barry (1741–1806)
The Temptation of Adam 1767–70
Self-portrait as Timanths c.1780–1803
The Death of Adonis
 Augustus Nicholas Burke (1838–1891) Connemara Girl (1865).
 Nathaniel Hone the Elder (1718–84) The Conjurer, 1775
 Hugh Douglas Hamilton (1740–1808) Frederick Hervey, Bishop of Derry and Fourth Earl of Bristol (1730–1803), with his Granddaughter Lady Caroline Crichton (1779–1856), in the Gardens of the Villa Borghese, Rome c.1790
 Francis Danby (1793–1861) The Opening of the Sixth Seal, 1828
 Daniel Maclise (1806–1870) The Marriage of Strongbow and Aoife, 1854
 Sarah Purser (1848–1943) Le Petit Dejeuner 1881
 Roderic O'Conor (1860–1940) Le Jeune Bretonne c.1895
 Walter Osborne (1859–1903) Dublin Streets: a Vendor of Books, 1889, In a Dublin Park, Light and Shade c.1895
 John Lavery (1856–1941) The Artist's Studio: Lady Hazel Lavery with her Daughter Alice and Step-Daughter Eileen 1909–13
 Paul Henry (1876–1958) Launching the Currach 1910–11
 William John Leech (1881–1968) Convent Garden, Brittany c.1912
 Sean Keating (1889–1977) An Allegory c.1922
 Mainie Jellett (1897–1944) Decoration 1923
 Gerard Dillon (1916–1971) The Little Green Fields c.1945
 Louis le Brocquy (1916–2012) A Family 1951
 William Orpen (1878–1931) "Portrait of John Count McCormack" 1923

The Yeats Collection 
 Jack B. Yeats (1871–1957)
 Bachelor's Walk, in Memory 1915 (On loan from a private collection)
 The Liffey Swim 1923
 A Morning in a City 1937
 Grief 1952
 John Butler Yeats (1839–1922) John O'Leary 1904

Drawings and watercolours 
James Malton (1760–1803) The Custom House
Joseph Mallord William Turner (1775–1851) 
 A Ship against the Mewstone, at the Entrance to Plymouth Sound
 Fishing Boats on Folkestone Beach
Dante Gabriel Rossetti (1828–82) Jane Burden as Queen Guinevere 1858
Frederick William Burton (1816–1900) Hellelil and Hildebrand, the Meeting on Turret Stairs, 1864 1864
James Abbott McNeill Whistler (1834–1903) Nocturne in Grey and Gold – Piccadilly, 1881–83
Edgar Degas (1834–1917) Two Ballet Dancers in a Dressing Room
Pablo Ruiz Picasso (1881–1973) Two Dancers 1925

Zurich Portrait Prize 
Originally the Hennessy Portrait Prize, the Zurich Portrait Prize is an exhibition of commissioned artists creating works of portraiture. The Prize is open to artists in all mediums who are either citizens in Ireland or Irish citizens living abroad. The prize consists of €15,000 and a €5,000 commission to create a portrait that would be exhibited in the gallery. Previous winners include 
 2018 Mandy O'Neill
 2019 Enda Bowe.

When it was the Hennessy Portrait Prize, the prize winners were
 2017 Jack Hickey
 2016 Gerry Davis
 2015 Vera Klute
 2014 Nick Miller

Library and archives collections 
The library and archives collections at the National Gallery of Ireland encompass unique and historically significant collections for the study of art history.  The origins of the collections can be traced back to the foundation of the institution over one hundred and sixty years ago. Covering the visual arts from the classical to the contemporary these collections continue to be a vital research element of the National Collection.  The development of the library and archive has been supported principally through public funding and the private donations of generous benefactors.

Open to the public, it has particularly rich holdings relating to the history of western European art from the Middle Ages on, and the collections relating to Irish and Italian art are extensive. The collection amounts to over 100,000 published volumes, in addition to significant archival holdings.

See also
 List of national galleries

References

Citations

Sources 
Irish Statute Book
 National Gallery of Ireland Act 1854
 National Gallery of Ireland Act 1855
 National Gallery (Amendment) Act 1865: see 
 National Gallery of Ireland Act 1928
 National Gallery of Ireland Act 1963
 National Cultural Institutions Act 1997, Part VI

Secondary
 Raymond Keaveney (2002), The National Gallery of Ireland: Essential Guide. London: Scala Publishers. 
 Homan Potterton (2003), The National Gallery of Ireland in Brian Lalor (Ed.) The Encyclopedia of Ireland. Dublin: Gill & Macmillan. 
 Homan Potterton, Introduction to National Gallery of Ireland: Illustrated Summary Catalogue of Paintings. Dublin: Gill & Macmillan.

External links 

National Gallery of Ireland website
The Millennium Wing on Irish-architecture.com
Reports of the Director of the National Gallery of Ireland 1883–1920 from EPPI (Enhanced British Parliamentary Papers on Ireland)

Art museums established in 1864
Art museums and galleries in the Republic of Ireland
Arts in Dublin (city)
Irish art
National museums of the Republic of Ireland
Museums in Dublin (city)
1864 establishments in Ireland
Ireland
Department of Tourism, Culture, Arts, Gaeltacht, Sport and Media